Welington Celso de Melo  (17 November 1946 – 21 December 2016) was a Brazilian mathematician. Known for his contributions to dynamical systems theory, he served as full professor at Instituto Nacional de Matemática Pura e Aplicada from 1980 to 2016. Melo wrote numerous papers, one being a complete description of the topological behavior of 1-dimensional real dynamical systems (co-authored with Marco Martens and Sebastian van Strien).
He proved the global hyperbolicity of renormalization for r unimodal maps (co-authored with Alberto Pinto and  Edson de Faria). He was a recipient of the 2003 TWAS Prize.

Biography
Born on November 17, 1946, in Guapé, Minas Gerais, Welington studied electrical engineering at the Federal University of Minas Gerais (1969). He adopted mathematics after attending a course in the researcher of the Elon Lages Lima Institute in a colloquium in Poços de Caldas, Minas Gerais. Invited by Elon to study at Instituto Nacional de Matemática Pura e Aplicada he moved to Rio de Janeiro with his wife Gilza in 1970, with Jacob Palis his advisor, where Welington completed his doctorate in two years, with a thesis published in the prestigious Inventiones Mathematicae in 1972. He did his post-doctorate in mathematics at the University of California, Berkeley in 1972. He returned two years later to Brazil to make a career as a researcher at IMPA, where he stayed ever since.

Appreciated by different generations of mathematicians, Welington was known and respected for his academic rigor and scientific productivity. Besides mathematics, he was passionate about sailing. On 1987  Steve Smale, Charles Pugh and Welington sailed the Pacific in a long journey on Smale's  43-foot Stardust.  On his 30-foot Doisdu boat, he sailed at least a hundred days a year, mostly along  Angra dos Reis's coast. He interpreted the wind with mastery, a phenomenon that can be modeled by dynamic systems, his mathematical specialty. He was proud to have taken on board the Doisdu six Fields medalists and many friends of IMPA.

He died on December 21, 2016, at age 70, of complications of a heart attack.

Awards and honors
 Brazilian Academy of Sciences, Member (1991)
 National Order of Scientific Merit, Commander (1996) 
  Invited Lecturer at the International Congress of Mathematicians, (1998)
 National Order of Scientific Merit, Grand Cross (2002) 
 Third World Academy of Sciences Prize (2003) 
 The World Academy of Sciences, Member (2005)

References

External links
Welington de Melo's website at IMPA
Curriculum Vitae

1946 births
2016 deaths
21st-century Brazilian mathematicians
20th-century Brazilian  mathematicians
People from Minas Gerais
Recipients of the Great Cross of the National Order of Scientific Merit (Brazil)
Instituto Nacional de Matemática Pura e Aplicada alumni
Instituto Nacional de Matemática Pura e Aplicada researchers
TWAS laureates
Dynamical systems theorists